Sébastien Flochon (born 19 January 1993) is a French professional footballer who plays as a midfielder for Championnat National club Boulogne.

Career 
On 8 May 2018, Flochon played as Paris Saint-Germain won 2–0 to clinch the 2017–18 Coupe de France with goals from Edinson Cavani and Giovani Lo Celso. He was the captain of Les Herbiers when they reached the 2018 Coupe de France Final. Flochon was allowed to lift the trophy with PSG skipper Thiago Silva as a reward for his side's terrific cup run to the final. In July 2021, he signed with Créteil.

Personal life
Born in France, Flochon is of Italian descent. He is a good friend of France international Samuel Umtiti.

References

External links
 
 

1993 births
Living people
Footballers from Lyon
French footballers
French people of Italian descent
Association football midfielders
Olympique Lyonnais players
Le Havre AC players
CA Bastia players
Les Herbiers VF players
FC Chambly Oise players
US Créteil-Lusitanos players
US Boulogne players
Ligue 2 players
Championnat National players
Championnat National 2 players
Championnat National 3 players